The Rt Rev Herbert Linford Gwyer was the second Bishop of George, and a survivor of the sinking of .

He was educated at Uppingham and Magdalene College, Cambridge. After a period of study at Westcott House, Cambridge he was ordained in 1906 and he began his career with a curacy in Kirkburton after which he was a missionary in Qu'Appelle. A World War I Chaplain to the Forces, he was later Vicar of Christ Church, Staincliffe and St Johns, Wakefield before his elevation to the episcopate. He died on 18 November 1960.

Notes

Year of birth unknown
People educated at Uppingham School
Alumni of Magdalene College, Cambridge
20th-century Anglican Church of Southern Africa bishops
Anglican bishops of George
1960 deaths
World War I chaplains
Royal Army Chaplains' Department officers
Alumni of Westcott House, Cambridge